Mark Gilroy is an American publisher and author notable for writing character-driven crime thrillers. USA Today reviewer Serena Chase described his crime thriller Cuts Like A Knife as an "intense, eerie, funny and suspenseful thriller with a very subtle faith thread that enriches rather than suffocates the story." Publishers Weekly described the thriller as having an "evil criminal, dedicated cop, and exciting ending." A reviewer of his second novel, Every Breath You Take, suggested that "shifts between private and public reactions nicely fit the spiritual themes in the material." Gilroy has worked thirty years in the publishing industry.

Books
 Every Breath You Take, Worthy Publishing, 365 Pages, 978-1617950681.
 Cuts Like A Knife Worthy Publishing, 416 pages, April 3, 2012, 
 Cold As Ice (not yet released)

References

1958 births
21st-century American novelists
American Christian writers
American crime fiction writers
American male novelists
Living people
People from Brentwood, Tennessee
Writers from Dayton, Ohio
Novelists from Tennessee
20th-century American novelists
20th-century American male writers
21st-century American male writers
Novelists from Ohio
20th-century American non-fiction writers
21st-century American non-fiction writers
American male non-fiction writers